Hix is an unincorporated community in Madison County, in the U.S. state of Georgia.

History
A post office called Hix was established in 1880, and remained in operation until 1907. the community was named after A. H. Hix, an early settler.

References

Unincorporated communities in Madison County, Georgia
Unincorporated communities in Georgia (U.S. state)